The American Widescreen Museum is a virtual museum devoted to motion picture history, especially widescreen processes, early color cinematography, and the technical development of sound film. It is curated by Martin Hart and was established in 1996.

References

External links
 The American Widescreen Museum

Virtual museums
Museums in popular culture
Cinema museums in the United States
Internet properties established in 1996